Balarampur or Balrampur may refer to the following places:

India 
 Balrampur, a city in Uttar Pradesh
 Balrampur district, Uttar Pradesh, in Uttar Pradesh
 Balrampur (Lok Sabha constituency), in Uttar Pradesh
 Balrampur (Assembly constituency), in Uttar Pradesh
 Balrampur, Ambedkar Nagar, a town in Uttar Pradesh
 Balrampur district, Chhattisgarh
 Balarampur, Purulia, a town in West Bengal
 Balarampur, Budge Budge, a town in West Bengal
 Balarampur, Purulia (Vidhan Sabha constituency) in Purulia district, West Bengal
 Balarampur, Purulia (community development block) in Purulia district, West Bengal
 Balrampur, Katihar (Vidhan Sabha constituency) in Katihar district, Bihar

Nepal 
 Balarampur, Kapilvastu, Nepal
 Balarampur, Rupandehi, Nepal